The 1994–95 Czech First League was the second season of top-tier football in the Czech Republic.

League changes

Relegated to the 1994–95 Czech 2. Liga
 Dukla Prague
 Vítkovice

Promoted from the 1993–94 Czech 2. Liga
 Benešov
 Jablonec

Stadia and locations

League table

Results

Top goalscorers

See also
 1994–95 Czech Cup
 1994–95 Czech 2. Liga

References

  ČMFS statistics

Czech First League seasons
Czech
1994–95 in Czech football